Los Angeles is an EP by Graf Orlock. It is inspired and based on the action/crime film, Heat. It was released by Vitriol Records on April 10, 2012. The first 7" pressing was limited to 200 copies, while the second pressing is limited to 600.

Reception
Natalie Zina Walschots of Exclaim! described Los Angeles as "tight" and "explosive", "designed to titillate and entertain".

Track listing
"Dead Man Talking" – 2:11
"No Attachments" - 1:44
"Couples Seeking Comfort/No Point" - 2:13
"Quick on the Trigger" - 4:04

Personnel
"Karl Bournze" – vocals
"Jason Schmidt" – guitar, vocals
"Svarn Kalhoune" – bass
"Alan Hunter" – drums

References

2012 EPs
Graf Orlock (band) EPs